Miss International 1971, the 11th Miss International pageant, was held on May 26, 1971 at the Long Beach Municipal Auditorium, Long Beach, California, United States once more (the U.S. staged the first 7 Miss International pageants, from 1960 to 1967). 50 contestants competed for the pageant. At the end of the contest, Jane Hansen from New Zealand was crowned as Miss International 1971 by outgoing titleholder, Aurora Pijuan from the Philippines.

Results

Placements

Contestants

  - Evelina Elena Scheidl
  - Carolyn Tokoly
  - Martha Flaschka
  - Sandra Carey
  - Nancy Maria Marcella Stoop
  - Maxine S. Bean
  - Maria V. Villarejo
  - Maria Bernadete Heemann
  - Pamela Wood
  - Norma Joyce Hickey
  - Alicia Vicuña
  - Patricia Escobar Rodríguez
  - Imelda Thodé
  - Bente Dorte Nielsen
  - Fatima Scheker
  - Susana Castro Jaramillo
  - Hannele Halme
  - Laurence Valée
  - Christa Saul
  - Phyllis May Bost
  - Doris Laurice Azurdia
  - Ans Krupp
  - Doris Van Tuyl
  - Matthildur "Lolo" Gudmundsdóttir
  - Samita Mukherjee
  - Brenda Guidon
  - Carmela Man
  - Rossana Barbieri
  - Reiko Yoneyama
  - Choi Sook-ae
  - Silviane Weiler
  - Doris Abdilla
  - Carolina Cortázar
  - Jane Cheryl Hansen
  - Odilie Díaz
  - May Lindstad
  - Betzabé Delgado
  - Evelyn Santos Camus
  - Marie M. de Castro
  - Doris L. Morales
  - Consuelo Varela Costales
  - Ingrid Mamadeus
  - Maud Andersson
  - Regula Herrmann
  - Supuk Likitkul
  - Dixy Ann Hepburn
  - Carmen C. López
  - Jacqueline Lee Jochims
  - Sonia Zaya Ledezma Corvo
  - Dunja Ercegovic

External links
Pageantopolis - 1971 Miss International

1971
1970s in Los Angeles County, California
1971 beauty pageants
Beauty pageants in the United States